Pats Lake is a small alpine lake in Elmore County, Idaho, United States, located in the Sawtooth Mountains in the Sawtooth National Recreation Area.  The lake is accessed from Sawtooth National Forest trail 494 along Johnson Creek.

Pats Lake is in the Sawtooth Wilderness, and a wilderness permit can be obtained at a registration box at trailheads or wilderness boundaries.  The lake is just downstream of Arrowhead Lake.

See also
List of lakes of the Sawtooth Mountains (Idaho)

References

Glacial lakes of the Sawtooth Wilderness
Lakes of Elmore County, Idaho
Lakes of Idaho